Heeslingen is a municipality in the district of Rotenburg, in Lower Saxony, Germany. It has 4788 inhabitants.

Heeslingen belonged to the Prince-Archbishopric of Bremen. In 1648 the Prince-Archbishopric was transformed into the Duchy of Bremen, which was first ruled in personal union by the Swedish and from 1715 on by the Hanoverian Crown. In 1823 the Duchy was abolished and its territory became part of the Stade Region.

References

Municipalities in Lower Saxony